Robert James Lee (December 28, 1911 – December 31, 1974) was a Canadian professional ice hockey player who played one game for the Montreal Canadiens in the National Hockey League. He was inducted to the British Ice Hockey Hall of Fame in 1949.

Career 
Lee played for the Baltimore Orioles in the Eastern Hockey League between 1934 and 1936, the Brighton Tigers in 1936–37 and between 1946 and 1954, the Earls Court Rangers between 1937 and 1939, the Quebec Aces between 1939 and 1942, the Montreal Royals and the Montreal Canadiens in 1942–43, and the Wembley Lions in 1945–46.

See also
List of players who played only one game in the NHL

References

1911 births
1974 deaths
Brighton Tigers players
British Ice Hockey Hall of Fame inductees
Canadian ice hockey centres
Earls Court Rangers players
Montreal Canadiens players
People from Verdun, Quebec
Place of death missing
Quebec Aces (QSHL) players
Ice hockey people from Montreal
Wembley Lions players
Canadian expatriate ice hockey players in England